The Standard Oil Company Filling Station at 638 College St. in Bowling Green, Kentucky was built in 1921 by Standard Oil of Kentucky.  It was listed on the National Register of Historic Places in 2010.

It was operated as a filling station until 1956.  The station was renovated and reopened as public restrooms for the adjacent Circus Square Park in 2009.

The renovation included having reproduction Red Crown Gasoline globes made, funded by the Landmark Association.

See also 
 Standard Oil Gasoline Station (Plant City, Florida)
 Standard Oil Gasoline Station (Odell, Illinois)
 Standard Oil Gasoline Station (Plainfield, Illinois)
 National Register of Historic Places listings in Warren County, Kentucky

References

Gas stations on the National Register of Historic Places in Kentucky
National Register of Historic Places in Bowling Green, Kentucky
Buildings designated early commercial in the National Register of Historic Places
Commercial buildings completed in 1921
Transportation in Warren County, Kentucky
1921 establishments in Kentucky
Restrooms in the United States
Standard Oil